Yamansaz (Yamanhaź) is a rural locality (a selo) and the administrative centre of Yamansazsky Selsoviet, Zilairsky District, Bashkortostan, Russia. The population was 733 as of 2010. There are 8 streets.

Geography 
Yamansaz is located 50 km east of Zilair (the district's administrative centre) by road. Matrayevo is the nearest rural locality.

References 

Rural localities in Zilairsky District